Suprofen is a nonsteroidal anti-inflammatory drug (NSAID) developed by Janssen Pharmaceutica that was marketed as 1% eye drops under the trade name Profenal.

Uses
Suprofen was originally used as tablet, but oral uses have been discontinued due to renal effects.  It was subsequently used exclusively as a topical ophthalmic solution, typically to prevent miosis during and after ophthalmic surgery. This application has been discontinued as well, at least in the US.

References 

Nonsteroidal anti-inflammatory drugs
Thiophenes
Propionic acids
Aromatic ketones
Janssen Pharmaceutica